The Pacification of Wujek  was a strike-breaking action by the Polish police and army at the Wujek Coal Mine in Katowice, Poland, culminating in the massacre of nine striking miners on December 16, 1981.

It was part of a large-scale action aimed to break the Solidarity free trade union after the introduction of martial law in Poland in 1981. Although the strike was suppressed, in a longer term, it turned out to be a milestone towards the collapse of the authoritarian system in Poland and, ultimately, to the collapse of the Eastern Bloc. It was a site of numerous protests, including by Solidarity activist Anna Walentynowicz who commemorated a plaque to the murdered miners shortly after she left prison at Gołdap.

The massacre
On December 16, three days after the introduction of the martial law in Poland, pro-Solidarity miners striking against the declaration of the martial law by General Wojciech Jaruzelski were dispersed by the troops of the Polish army and police. The forces used in the main thrust against the miners consisted of eight companies of riot police (ZOMO, supported by ORMO (police reservists) and NOMO) with seven water cannons, three companies of military infantry fighting vehicles (each of 10 vehicles) and one company of tanks. The miners repeatedly fought them off with their tools. During the brawl a number of strikers and 41 troops were injured, including 11 severely.

In the apex of the events, a commando-type special platoon of ZOMO opened the "shoot to kill" fire at the strikers, killing nine of them (Jan Stawisiński, Joachim Gnida, Józef Czekalski, Krzysztof Giza, Ryszard Gzik, Bogusław Kopczak, Andrzej Pełka, Zbigniew Wilk and Zenon Zając) and wounding 21 others. One of the deaths took place after 20 or more days in hospital with severe head-wounds.

Aftermath
The repressions after the pacification included sentencing of three miners to jail terms of three to four years in prison.

On June 1, 2007, more than two decades after the incident, 15 former members of the special platoon were sentenced to prison terms for their part in the killings.<ref>Polish court sentences 15 policemen in 1981 massacre at coal mine, International Herald Tribune, May 31, 2007</ref> Most of them were sentenced to the terms of 2.5 to three years in prison, except their former platoon commander, Romuald Cieślak, who was sentenced to 11 years in prison. The court however failed to establish who sent the special platoon to Wujek (and thus acquitted the former vice-chief of communist police in Katowice, Marian Okrutny).

Popular culture
The tragedy was portrayed in the 1994 feature film Śmierć jak kromka chleba (Death like daily bread) by Kazimierz Kutz and the 2006 graphic novel 1981: Kopalnia Wujek''.

See also

1981 warning strike in Poland
August 31, 1982 demonstrations in Poland
1988 Polish strikes
History of Solidarity
Jastrzebie-Zdroj 1980 strikes
Lublin 1980 strikes
Summer 1981 hunger demonstrations in Poland
1981 strike at Piast Coal Mine in Bieruń

References

External links
Pictures from the funerals of the killed strikers

1981 in Poland
Law enforcement in Poland
Massacres in Poland
Miners' labor disputes
Protests in Poland
Solidarity (Polish trade union)
Anti-communism in Poland
Conflicts in 1981
Deaths by firearm in Poland